Ricky Lee Nelson (May 8, 1959 – November 19, 2021) was an American professional baseball outfielder who played for the Seattle Mariners of Major League Baseball (MLB) from 1983 to 1986.

Career
Nelson attended Arizona State University and was selected by Seattle in the 1981 MLB draft. He made his MLB debut on May 17, against the California Angels. His most productive MLB season came in 1983, when he registered 291 at-bats in 98 games, recording a .254 batting average. He made his final MLB appearance on August 2, 1986, at the Kingdome, appearing as a pinch runner in a 7-3 Seattle victory over the California Angels.

In his 123-game major league career, Nelson batted .247, with six home runs, 39 runs batted in, 38 runs scored, 79 hits, 13 doubles, 3 triples and 8 stolen bases. In , Nelson managed the Oakland Athletics' entry in the Arizona Fall League to the league championship.

Death
He died from COVID-19 pneumonia on November 19, 2021, at the age of 62.

References

External links

1959 births
2021 deaths
African-American baseball managers
African-American baseball players
American expatriate baseball players in Canada
Arizona State Sun Devils baseball players
Bakersfield Mariners players
Baseball players from Arizona
Bellingham Mariners players
Buffalo Bisons (minor league) players
Calgary Cannons players
Major League Baseball outfielders
Minor league baseball managers
People from Eloy, Arizona
Salt Lake City Gulls players
Seattle Mariners players
Sportspeople from the Phoenix metropolitan area
Tidewater Tides players
21st-century African-American people
20th-century African-American sportspeople
Deaths from the COVID-19 pandemic in Arizona